Jurgen Sino (born 24 January 1997 in Vlorë) is an Albanian football player who most recently played as a forward for Butrinti Sarandë in the Albanian Second Division.

References

External links
 Profile - FSHF

1997 births
Living people
Footballers from Vlorë
Albanian footballers
Albania youth international footballers
Association football forwards
Flamurtari Vlorë players
KF Oriku players
KF Butrinti players
Kategoria Superiore players
Kategoria e Dytë players